The European Drift Championship (EDC) was an annual drifting series held in the United Kingdom from 2007–2012. The series was previously known as D1 Great Britain (D1GB) in 2006 and D1UK from 2002–2005, but event organizers disassociated from the D1 Grand Prix in 2007. D1UK was also known as the Autoglym Drift Championship due to sponsorship by Autoglym.

In 2008, EDC introduced the British Drift Championship (BDC) as a feeder series, but the BDC broke off to form its own annual professional series just a year later and, as of 2020, is now aligned with Formula D.

In 2010 the championship organisers made the controversial move to change from a Top 16 to a Top 8 invitational format. The championship featured only 8 drivers who were all sponsored by Pirelli Tires. All championship rounds became part of the Modified Live car shows alongside the UK Time Attack series.

At the end of the 2012 season, the championship folded due to drivers moving over to the British Drift Championship and Modified Live events now only feature drift demonstrations rather than full competitions.

Past Champions
D1UK/Autoglym Drift Championship

D1 Great Britain

European Drift Championship

References 

Drifting series
Auto racing series in the United Kingdom
Awards established in 2007
Defunct auto racing series
Recurring events disestablished in 2012